Endozoicomonas numazuensis is a rod-shaped, facultatively anaerobic and non-motile bacterium from the genus of Endozoicomonas which has been isolated from a marine sponge from Numazu in Japan.

References

Oceanospirillales
Bacteria described in 2013